Final testament may refer to:

Will and testament, a legal document for allocating property after one's death
The Final Testament, British title of 2011 novel The Final Testament of the Holy Bible
Quran: The final testament, an edition of the Quran edited by Rashad Khalifa